The Rocky River is a relatively short river in Cuyahoga County, Ohio that forms the natural western boundaries of Cleveland and the suburb of Lakewood with the suburbs of Fairview Park and Rocky River. The latter community is named after the river. To the south of Fairview Park and west of Cleveland Hopkins International Airport, the river forms the natural boundary between the suburb of Brook Park and the communities of North Olmsted and Olmsted Township. Ranked by Field & Stream as one of the top steelhead trout rivers in the world, the Rocky River is the center of the Rocky River Reservation of the Cleveland Metroparks.

Watershed
The river itself is formed by the confluence of the East and West Branches in North Olmsted at Cedar Point Hill (unrelated to the theme park of the same name north of Sandusky), just west of Cleveland Hopkins International Airport.

The headwaters of the larger West Branch are predominantly located in Medina County, where the north and south branches merge to form the west branch and flow northward through, among other locales, the town of Olmsted Falls. The East Branch first begins in the Cleveland suburb of North Royalton, near State Rd. and Wallings Rd. The flow here is actually to the south, through Richfield and Hinckley Townships. The East Branch wraps around Whipp's Ledges in Hinckley Township and begins its north-northwest journey. Hinckley Lake is actually the East Branch Rocky, impounded in the late 1920s/early 1930s. On its course back through southwestern Cuyahoga County, the East Branch is an important local feature in the cities of Strongsville and Berea.

The lower portions of both branches and the mainstem Rocky River flow through a V-shaped valley; the valley and the river are part of the Cleveland Metroparks system.  The Rocky River valley is heavily forested, and a parkway along the river provides access to many different activities available in the park.  Given the heavy population density of Cleveland and its older suburbs, many of which border the valley, the valley provides a popular location for recreational activities that would be difficult in other parts of the city.

Pollution
The Rocky River is largely free from industrial pollution.  This is because most of its sources are in agricultural and suburban areas, which results in natural organic pollution and sewage, resulting in higher bacteria levels than rivers downstream from industrial discharges.

Crossings and tributaries
This depth has required several high-level and low-level bridges to cross the valley between Lakewood and Rocky River and between Cleveland and Fairview Park.

Several of the low-level bridges which cross the river within the valley are subject to closure and flooding during and after heavy storms, but these low-level bridges are mostly used by local traffic on the Valley Parkway which follows Rocky River's course, and cross it several times.

From the north (mouth) upstream to south (source):

See also

 List of rivers of Ohio

References

External links

 https://www.clevelandmetroparks.com/parks/visit/parks/rocky-river-reservation
 Rocky River Watershed Council

Rivers of Cuyahoga County, Ohio
Rivers of Medina County, Ohio
Rivers of Ohio
Tributaries of Lake Erie